Shepherd & Woodward are a traditional clothing outfitters in High Street, Oxford, England. In particular, they provide academic gowns and other clothing for the University of Oxford. The shop's origins date back to 1845.

The company also runs Walters of Oxford in Turl Street and the Varsity Shop, Castells & Son, in Broad Street.

History
The company was set up by Arthur Shepherd, who in 1877 took over the tailor's shop of Arthur Brockington in 62 Cornmarket St, Oxford. After Arthur's death in 1895, his son Ernest took over the business, and in 1902 he opened a branch named Arthur Shepherd in 32 Trinity St, Cambridge under independent management. In 1929 Ernest Shepherd merged his business with Wilton Woodward, and moved their premises, now renamed Shepherd & Woodward, to The High Street. Originally a gentleman's tailor, it has over the years specialised in academic dress and academic memorabilia as well.

The Cambridge branch of the business was eventually sold to its running partner in 1938. It traded under the name of Arthur Shepherd until 2017, when it closed down upon its last owner's retirement.

References

External links 
 Shepherd & Woodward Ltd website
 109–112 High Street, Oxford

1845 establishments in England
Shops in Oxford
Independent stores
History of Oxford
Retail companies established in 1845